Finland women's national under-20 football team represents Finland at the FIFA U-20 Women's World Cup.

FIFA U-20 Women's World Cup record

Current squad 
Finland squad for the 2014 FIFA U-20 Women's World Cup.

See also

 Finland women's national football team
 Finland women's national under-17 football team
 Women's association football around the world
 Finland men's national football team

References

External links 
Finland women's national under-20 football team Official Homepage (in Finnish)

under-20
European women's national under-20 association football teams